The Pljevlja District was a former district within Montenegro. The administrative centre of the Pljevlja District was Pljevlja.

Municipalities
The district encompassed the municipalities of:
Maoče
Gradac
Pljevlja
Žabljak

Demographics

See also
Districts of Montenegro
Administrative divisions of Montenegro

References

Districts of Montenegro